The 2012–13 Hong Kong Junior Challenge Shield is the 85th season of the Hong Kong Junior Challenge Shield, a knock-out competition for Hong Kong's 40 football clubs playing below the top-tier division league. Wanchai are the defending champions, having beaten Happy Valley in the 2012 Final.

Schedule
The schedule for the Hong Kong Junior Challenge Shield is as follows:

First round
16 teams out of 40 teams are randomly drawn and required to compete starting from the first round, while other 24 teams will start from the second round. The eight matches will all be played on 16 December 2012.

Second round
The second round draw included 8 first round winners and 24 teams that is not required to play in the first round. All second round matches will be played on 23 December 2012.

Third round
16 second round winners will fight for 8 quarter-finals places on 6 January 2013.

Quarter-finals
8 third round winners will strive for 4 semi-finals places on 13 January 2013. All matches will be played at Po Kong Village Road Park. Yau Tsim Mong from Fourth Division is the lowest team still in the competition.

Semi-finals
4 quarter-finals winners will strive for 2 final places on 20 January 2013. All matches will be played at Po Kong Village Road Park. Kwai Tsing from Third Division is the lowest team still in the competition.

Final
Yuen Long defeated Kwok Keung in the final and won the champions.

References

External links
 Junior Shield - Hong Kong Football Association

2012–13 in Hong Kong football
2012–13 domestic association football cups